Bashkir may refer to:
Bashkirs, an ethnic group in Russia
Bashkir language, a Turkic language spoken by the Bashkirs
A citizen of Bashkortostan
The (American) Bashkir Curly or Curly Horse, a curly-coated American horse breed
The Bashkir horse, a horse breed from Bashkortostan in the Russian Federation
Stefan Bashkir, a character in Eoin Colfer's novel The Supernaturalist
The V'ornn name for their merchant class, in Eric Van Lustbader's Pearl Saga

See also
Bashkir State University
Bashkiria (disambiguation)

Language and nationality disambiguation pages